DWGO (1008 AM) Radyo Serbisyo is a radio station owned and operated by Subic Broadcasting Corporation in the Philippines. The station's studio and transmitter are located at Admiral Royale Bldg., 17 St. cor. Anonas St., Brgy. West Bajac-Bajac, Olongapo.

History
DWGO first went on air on July 29, 1969, as "Radio On The Go", being the flagship AM radio station of Subic Broadcasting Corporation with then frequency 1550 kHz at 2.5 KW. This is the day where in listeners of Olongapo City experienced listening through the airwaves of DWGO, airing news and current affairs program and pop format of music. It was shut down in 1972 at the start of Martial Law. in June 1976, DWGO returned under new management and by 1978 in the new frequency of 1008 kHz.

References

Radio stations in Olongapo
News and talk radio stations in the Philippines
Radio stations established in 1969